Curtain Razor is a 1949 Warner Bros. Looney Tunes short directed by Friz Freleng. The short was released on May 21, 1949, and stars Porky Pig.

Plot
An operatic tenor voice (provided by Mel Blanc) and piano music for the Act III Prelude from Richard Wagner's opera Lohengrin accompany the opening credits and earth-shaking scene as hopeful stage talents wait outside the office of Goode and Korny: Talent Agents. While singing, the voice boasts of his previous experience in other venues. The voice turns out to belong to a tiny grasshopper, who ends his performance with Blanc's trademark pronunciation of "Coo-camonga" ("I killed 'em in Coo-camonga!"). Porky, who is the agency's producer and listening to the auditions, tells the grasshopper he might have a spot for him. The rest of the short consists of a series of acts by various performers, most of whom Porky rejects:

 A Hen (who bears a resemblance to Disney's Clara Cluck, voiced by Dorothy Lloyd) clucks Blue Danube. Porky seems to like this act, but the hen literally "lays an egg" and takes this event in its figurative sense in that her act flopped ("So I laid an egg!"). Porky agrees by pulling a lever next to his desk that sends the hen and the egg with a sad looking chick (who resembles Tweety) in it through a trap door in the floor.
 A Fox bursts in telling Porky that his act is the best ever, but Porky tells him that it's not his turn yet.
 A Turtle resembling Cecil Turtle but with Blanc's voice says he is the "man of a 1,000 voices." He goes through a rapid fire montage of voice impressions (including Lionel Barrymore, Senator Claghorn, Bugs Bunny, and Jimmy Durante). Porky says that he counted only nine hundred ninety nine voices. The turtle is stumped as to what his 1,000th voice is and exits the office hoping that he'll remember it later (a similar character is Ken Terry in Noah Byrd's Series).
 Bingo the Parrot, Frankie the Rooster, and Al the Duck (resembling Bing Crosby, Frank Sinatra, and Al Jolson, respectively;  Bingo and Frankie are voiced by John Woodburry while Al is voiced by Mel Blanc) take it in turns singing the popular hit song "April Showers", each in the manner of their namesakes. Porky tells them that he'll consider their act but says after they leave that it was a low class act that only bobbysoxers would like (ironically, Porky has his socks rolled down to his ankles).
 A Two-headed man enters the office. Porky quotes "Oh boy, two-headed! This ought to be a sensational act!" The two-headed man quotes (in Blanc's voice) "Act, Shmact! I'm the Janitor" as he empties Porky's pail into another pail and leaves.
 The Fox barges into the office again, telling Porky to watch his act. Porky tells him to go back out and wait his turn.
 A Dog (voiced by Blanc) in a bathing suit named J. Fenton Hadding places his briefcase on the floor. It turns out to be an elevated platform that the dog rides through the office skylight 500 feet into the air. The dog then dives into a glass of water that he is holding in his hand (describing his whole act throughout). Porky sends the dog, stuck in his water glass, down the trap door.
 Crawford Coo (a man in a circus ringmaster's outfit) has a trained Pigeon act. He sets up various pigeon-sized acrobatic equipment and releases the pigeons from a box, but the pigeons fly out the window. Crawford tries tap dancing instead, but Porky sends him down the trap door (the gag is repeated in Show Biz Bugs, 1957).
 The fox bursts in again. Porky sends him down the trap door.
 A Shaggy Dog (voiced by Blanc) enters. Porky thinks it's a dog act, but the Shaggy Dog hands him a business card, announcing that he is the Itch and Scratch Flea Circus. The Shaggy Dog blows a whistle and Fleas hop from his back to build a tiny circus tent and carnival midway, then dismantle it when the Shaggy Dog blows the whistle again. The music played here is the Wackyland Rubber Band music featured in the shorts Tin Pan Alley Cats and Dough for the Do-do.

Finally, it is the Fox's turn to do his act. He dons a devil's costume and swallows atomic powder, TNT, gasoline, and finally, a lit match. BOOM! Porky thinks the act is terrific, but the Fox (now a transparent ghost) comes through the office door and says that there is only one tiny problem with the act: he can only do it once. (The same gag and punch line would be recycled near the end of the cartoon Show Biz Bugs, only with Daffy Duck blowing himself up.)

Home media
Curtain Razor is available restored on the Looney Tunes Super Stars' Porky & Friends: Hilarious Ham DVD release.
One of the wishes in Daffy Duck's Fantastic Island, minus the scenes with the fox and turtle.

References

External links
 

1949 animated films
1949 short films
1949 films
1940s English-language films
Short films directed by Friz Freleng
Porky Pig films
Looney Tunes shorts
1940s Warner Bros. animated short films
Cultural depictions of Frank Sinatra
Cultural depictions of Bing Crosby
Cultural depictions of Al Jolson
Animation based on real people
Films scored by Carl Stalling